Spring River Township is an inactive township in Lawrence County, in the U.S. state of Missouri.

Spring River Township was named after the stream of the same name.

References

Townships in Missouri
Townships in Lawrence County, Missouri